The Democratic Party of Kazakhstan was a political party formed on 1 July 1995 at the initiative of a group of representatives of the state apparatus. It was led by Altynbek Sarsenbaiuly who was Minister of Press and Mass Media at the time. The party won 12 seats in the 1995 legislative elections. It merged into a newly created pro-presidential party Otan in its 1st Congress on 1 March 1999.

References

Defunct political parties in Kazakhstan
1995 establishments in Kazakhstan
1999 disestablishments in Kazakhstan
Political parties established in 1995
Political parties disestablished in 1999